Juwel is a white German wine grape variety that was produced in the mid-20th century as a crossing between Kerner and Silvaner. By the end of the 20th century, only around 30 hectares of the grapes were still in production, mostly found in the Rheinhessen.

References

White wine grape varieties